Qu Dongyu (born October 29, 1963) is a Chinese diplomat who took up office as the ninth Director-General of the Food and Agriculture Organization (FAO) of the United Nations on 1 August 2019. He is the first Chinese national to head the Organization. Qu won the nomination on the first round of voting at the 41st FAO Conference on 23 June 2019, obtaining 108 of the 191 votes cast by the 194 member countries. He is married, with one daughter.

Early life and education 
Qu was born in Yongzhou, Hunan, China in October 1963. He trained to become a biologist, gaining a bachelor's degree from Hunan Agricultural University, a Master's in plant breeding and genetics from the Chinese Academy of Agricultural Sciences, and a Doctorate in Agricultural and Environmental Sciences from the University of Wageningen, Netherlands.

Career 
From 2001 to 2011 he was Vice President of the Chinese Academy of Agricultural Sciences. Between 2011 and 2015 he served as vice-chair of the Ningxia Hui Autonomous Region in China and in 2015 he became Vice-Minister of the Ministry of Agriculture and Rural Affairs, where he was involved in promoting international collaboration with organizations such as FAO and Centre for Agriculture and Bioscience International.

Food and Agriculture Organization 
Qu was supported by China in the 2018 election for Director-General of the FAO. The United States Department of State was concerned about Qu's potential victory, and Assistant Secretary of State for International Organization Affairs Kevin Moley moved to support Georgian politician David Kirvalidze, though many other American officials, including those at the U.S. Department of Agriculture and U.S. Embassy in Rome preferred Catherine Geslain-Lanéelle, the French agricultural engineer backed by the European Union.

Qu won the election in June 2019 with 108 votes over Geslain-Lanéelle's 71 and Kirvalidze's 12. Allegations of bribery and coercion by China to secure the votes of other FAO delegates featured prominently in the election.

Following the 2022 Russian invasion of Ukraine, diplomats have criticized Qu for failing to address the 2022 food crises. According to a former UN official interviewed by Politico Europe, "Nobody actually takes him seriously: It’s not him; it’s China," and "I’m not convinced he would make a single decision without first checking it with the capital." According to The Economist, "Many governments privately accuse the Chinese head of the UN Food and Agriculture Organisation, Qu Dongyu, of downplaying the impact on food security of Russia’s invasion of Ukraine, a huge grain producer. They presume the aim was to spare China’s ally, Mr Putin, from criticism."

References

External links 
 Biography at FAO.org
 Biography at ChinaVitae

1963 births
Living people
Food and Agriculture Organization officials
Chinese officials of the United Nations
People's Republic of China politicians from Hunan
Politicians from Yongzhou